David Štrombach (born 9 January 1996) is a Czech football player who currently plays for Viktoria Žižkov.

Career
Štrombach joined FK Blansko in 2019.

References

External links
 Profile at FC Zbrojovka Brno official site
 
 

1996 births
Living people
Czech footballers
Association football forwards
Czech First League players
Czech National Football League players
Slovak Super Liga players
FC Zbrojovka Brno players
MFK Skalica players
1. SK Prostějov players
1. SC Znojmo players
Czech expatriate footballers
Czech expatriate sportspeople in Slovakia
Expatriate footballers in Slovakia
People from Znojmo
Sportspeople from the South Moravian Region
Bohemian Football League players
FK Viktoria Žižkov players